B. crispa may refer to:

 Boettgeria crispa, a gastropod species
 Buddleja crispa, a bush species
 Byrsonima crispa, a nance tree species in the genus Byrsonima

See also
 Crispa (disambiguation)